Sasha, Benny y Erik are a pop supergroup  from Mexico. The group was formed by 3 former members of the Mexican pop group Timbiriche, consisting of Sasha Sokol, Benny Ibarra and Erik Rubin who are close friends in real life. With much anticipation by their fans, Sasha, Benny and Erik released the live album Primera Fila: Sasha Benny Erik. The project has enjoyed much success with a national tour that started in late 2012 and has continued through much of 2014. The album has been certified triple platinum + gold in Mexico for sales exceeding 210,000 copies. Originally, the band performed 2 concerts at the National Auditorium in Mexico City in April 2013, but due to demand, they did two more concerts at the venue in September of that same year. In 2013, they released En Vivo desde el Auditorio Nacional, which went gold a few days after its release. At the end of 2013, the album Primera Fila: Sasha Benny Erik was officially recognized by AMPROFON as the second best-selling album in Mexico that year (after the album "Confidencias" by Alejandro Fernandez). In late 2014, Sasha, Benny y Erik released their first studio album "Vuelta al Sol" and release "Esta Noche" as their first single. Next singles were "Todo tiene su lugar" ,"Japi" and "Punto de partida". In 2015, they performed at National Auditorium twice ( two concerts in May and other two in November). In early 2016, they will release a new live album with new songs and hits, performed with several guests. First single "Lo Siento" featuring Pepe Aguilar, was released on February 19. In May, "Entre Amigos" was released and the band announced the end of the project in December. The album was certified as Gold some weeks later and they began a farewell tour with a final performance on December 31.

Discography

Albums
2012: Primera Fila: Sasha Benny Erik
2013: En Vivo desde el Auditorio Nacional
2014: Vuelta Al Sol
2016: Entre Amigos

Singles
2012: "Cada Beso (Live Primera Fila)"
2013: "Sin Ti (Live Primera Fila)"
2013: "Como Hemos Cambiado (Live Primera Fila)"
2013: "Serás El Aire (En Vivo Desde El Auditorio Nacional)"
2014: "Esta Noche"
2015: "Todo Tiene Su Lugar"
2015: "Japi"
2015: "Japi (Versión Banda) (Ft. Edwin Luna Y La Trakalosa De Monterrey)"
2015: "Punto De Partida"
2016: "Lo Siento" (Ft. Pepe Aguilar )
2016: "Ay Amor" (Ft. Playa Limbo)

References

Timbiriche members
Mexican pop music groups
Musical groups established in 2012
Mexican musical trios
Timbiriche
Sony Music Latin artists
2012 establishments in Mexico